The Armstrong House is a single-story Greek Revival-style historic house built around 1840 and located on Broad St. in Lumpkin, Georgia, United States. It was listed on the National Register of Historic Places in 1982.

It is a one-story Greek Revival house. It was deemed notable as one of the earliest surviving houses in Lumpkin, as "a good example of the more modest interpretation of prevailing architectural styles in the early 19th century... occupied by less affluent or less ostentatious members of Lumpkin's 19th century merchant class."

References

National Register of Historic Places in Stewart County, Georgia
Greek Revival architecture in Georgia (U.S. state)
Houses completed in 1840